Eremiaphila arabica, common name Arabian mantis, is a species of praying mantis native to the Middle East and has been found in Egypt, Israel, Yemen, and Saudi Arabia.

See also
List of mantis genera and species

References

Eremiaphila
Mantodea of Africa
Insects described in 1871